"Hishoku no Sora" (緋色の空, Scarlet-colored Sky) is the second single of J-pop singer Mami Kawada. The title track was used as the first intro theme to the anime Shakugan no Shana. This single peaked at the #11 spot on the Oricon charts and has sold 16,503 copies on its first week. It stayed at the Oricon weekly charts for 18 weeks and sold a total of 36,661 copies overall.

The single will come in a limited CD+DVD edition (GNCA-0019) and a regular CD only edition (GNCA-0020). The DVD will contain the promotional video for Hishoku no Sora.

Reception
The single peak ranked 11th on Oricon's Weekly Singles Chart and remained on the chart for eighteen weeks. Anime News Network's Theron Martin described the "synth-pop" track, "Hishoku no Sora", as "solid" and "enthusiastic (if not entirely original-sounding)".

Track listing 
 - 4:15
Lyrics: Mami Kawada
Composition/Arrangement by: Tomoyuki Nakazawa
Another Planet - 5:50
Lyrics: Mami Kawada
Composition/Arrangement by: Tomoyuki Nakazawa
another planet ~twilight~ - 4:01
Lyrics: Mami Kawada
Composition by: Tomoyuki Nakazawa
Arrangement by: Maiko Iuchi
 - 4:14
another planet (instrumental) - 5:49

References

2005 singles
Mami Kawada songs
Shakugan no Shana songs
Songs with lyrics by Mami Kawada
Song recordings produced by I've Sound